Triatoma rubrovaria is an insect which is ubiquitous in Uruguay, in neighboring parts of northeastern Argentina, and in the southern states of Paraná and Rio Grande do Sul in Brazil. This species of triatomine is found mainly among exfoliate rocks known as pedregales. It was earlier reported as T. (triatoma) rubrovaria, a sylvatic species inhabiting rock piles, rarely found in human dwellings. This species may be a highly competent vector of Trypanosoma cruzi, the causative agent of Chagas disease. In Rio Grande do Sul, data from the Chagas disease Control Program have indicated an increasing of domiciliary and peridomiciliary invasion of T. rubrovaria, where it has become the most frequently triatomine species captured in that State since the control of T. infestans.

References

Almeida CE, Duarte R, Pacheco RS, Costa J 2002a. Triatoma rubrovaria (Blanchard, 1843) (Hemiptera-Reduviidae-Triatominae) II: trophic resources and ecological observations of five populations collected in the state of Rio Grande do Sul, Brazil. Mem Inst Oswaldo Cruz 97: 1127-1131
Almeida CE, Francischetti CN, Pacheco RS, Costa J 2003 Triatoma rubrovaria (Blanchard, 1843) (Hemiptera-Reduviidae-Triatominae) III: patterns of feeding, defecation and resistance to starvation. Mem Inst Oswaldo Cruz 98: 367-371
Almeida CE, Pacheco RS, Noireau F, Costa J 2002b. Triatoma rubrovaria (Blanchard, 1843) (Hemiptera-Reduviidae-Triatominae) I: isoenzymatic and chromatic patterns of five populations collected in the state of Rio Grande do Sul, Brazil. Mem Inst Oswaldo Cruz 97: 829-834
Almeida CE, Vinhaes MC, Almeida JR, Silveira AC, Costa J 2000. Monitoring the domiciliary and peridomiciliary invasion process of Triatoma rubrovaria in the state of Rio Grande do Sul, Brazil. Mem Inst Oswaldo Cruz 95: 761-768
Almeida CE, Folly-Ramos E, Agapito-Souza R, Magno-Esperança G, Pacheco RS, Costa J 2005. Triatoma rubrovaria (Blanchard, 1843) (Hemiptera-Reduviidae-Triatominae) IV: bionomic aspects on the vector capacity of nymphs. Mem Inst Oswaldo Cruz. 100: 231-235
Salvatella R, Calegari L, Puime A, Basmadjian, Rosa R, Guerrero J, Martinez M, Mendaro G, Briano D, Montero C, Wisniversky-Colli C 1994. Perfil alimentario de Triatoma rubrovaria (Blanchard, 1843) (Hemiptera, Triatominae) en ámbitos peridomiciliarios, de una localidad rural de Uruguay. Rev Inst Med Trop São Paulo 36: 311-320
Salvatella R, Rosa R, Basmadjian Y, Puime A, Calegari L, Guerrero J, Martinez M, Mendaro G, Briano D, Montero C, Wisnivesky-Colli C 1995. Ecology of Triatoma rubrovaria (Hemiptera, Triatominae) in wild and peridomestic environments of Uruguay. Mem Inst Oswaldo Cruz 90: 325-328

Reduviidae
Hemiptera of South America